Bosque, also known as El Bosque, is a small hamlet in Camajuani, Cuba. It is located in the wards (consejos populares) of La Quinta and Camajuani II.

History 
In the Ten Years' War on November 4, 1895, Leoncio Vidal ordered for a surrender of the El Bosque fort. In 1919 El Bosque was a barrio and apart of San Antonio de las Vueltas.

Economy 
According at the DMPF of Camajuani, El Bosque is a settlement not linked to any source of an economic or job development. 

In the hamlet there is an egg hatchery, owned by Lenier Juanrecio Torres.

References

External links 
 El Bosque (Camajuaní) on EcuRed

Populated places in Villa Clara Province